Honghe is a township of Jingchuan County, Gansu, China.

References 

Jingchuan County
Township-level divisions of Gansu